Kris Schaff (born September 24, 1992) is an American compound archer. He won the gold medal in the men's team event at the 2017 World Archery Championships held in Mexico City, Mexico. In 2021, he also won the gold medal in the men's team event at the World Archery Championships held in Yankton, United States.

In 2017, Schaff and Cassidy Cox won the bronze medal in the mixed team compound event at the World Games held in Wrocław, Poland. The following year, he won the silver medal in the men's team event at the 2018 Pan American Archery Championships held in Medellín, Colombia.

References

External links 
 

Living people
1992 births
Place of birth missing (living people)
American male archers
World Archery Championships medalists
Competitors at the 2017 World Games
World Games bronze medalists
World Games medalists in archery